Events from the year 1143 in Ireland.

Incumbents
High King: Toirdelbach Ua Conchobair

Events
 Dermod Mór na Cill Baghain MacCarthy became King of Desmond

Deaths
 Donogh MacCarthy, King of Desmond

References 

 
1140s in Ireland
Ireland
Years of the 12th century in Ireland